Louden Up Now is the second studio album by American dance-punk band !!!. Released on July 27, 2004, through Touch and Go Records in the United States and Warp Records in the rest of the world, the album was greeted by mainly positive reviews from critics, with AllMusic hailing it as "a modern-day agit-pop indie dance-rock classic." Louden Up Now sees the group continue to meld funky dance rhythms with post-punk influences.

Originally one edition of the album included a bonus disc containing a clean version. The LP edition track listing is the same as the CD version, although track 10 is omitted. Side one is tracks 1 and 2, side two is tracks 3 to 5, side three is tracks 6 and 7, and side four is tracks 8 and 9. A two-disc version was released in some countries containing 4 additional tracks on a second disc. One of the tracks was "Sunday 5.17 AM", which was later rerecorded for Myth Takes as "Yadnus".

Two singles were released from the album: "Hello? Is This Thing On?" and "Pardon My Freedom" while the 2003 single "Me and Giuliani Down by the Schoolyard" was included on the release.

Track listing

Personnel
Mario Andreoni – bass, guitar
Justin Van Der Volgen – bass
Tyler Pope – drum programming, bass, drums, percussion, keyboards, guitar
John Pugh XI – drums, vocals, gong, percussion
Gorman Dan – keyboards, percussion, trumpet
Nic Offer – vocals, keyboards
Allan Wilson – saxophone, keyboards, percussion

Charts

References

External links

2004 albums
!!! albums
Touch and Go Records albums
Warp (record label) albums